Michael Biddulph may refer to:

 Michael Biddulph (1610–1666) of Elmhurst, Member of Parliament for Lichfield (1660–1661)
 Sir Michael Biddulph, 2nd Baronet (c. 1652–1718), English politician, Member of Parliament for Lichfield five times (1679–1710)
 Michael Biddulph (1661–1697), Member of Parliament for Tamworth
 Sir Michael Biddulph (British Army officer) (1823–1904), British general officer and Gentleman Usher of the Black Rod
 Michael Biddulph, 1st Baron Biddulph (1834–1923), English politician, Member of Parliament in Herefordshire

See also
Biddulph (disambiguation)